The 1880 United States presidential election in Iowa took place on November 2, 1880, as part of the 1880 United States presidential election. Voters chose 11 representatives, or electors to the Electoral College, who voted for president and vice president.

Iowa voted for the Republican nominee, James A. Garfield, over the Democratic nominee, Winfield Scott Hancock. Garfield won the state by a margin of 24.19%.

With 10.02% of the popular vote, Iowa would prove to be Greenback Party candidate James B. Weaver's second strongest state after Texas.

Results

Results by county

See also
 United States presidential elections in Iowa

Notes

References

Iowa
1880
1880 Iowa elections